Amine Bouhijbha (born 28 February 1996) is a Tunisian weightlifter. He won the gold medal in the men's 56kg event at the 2015 African Games held in Brazzaville, Republic of the Congo. He is also a five-time gold medalist at the African Weightlifting Championships.

Career 

In 2015, he competed in the men's 56kg event at the World Weightlifting Championships held in Houston, United States. At the 2017 Islamic Solidarity Games held in Baku, Azerbaijan, he won the bronze medal in the men's 56kg event.

He represented Tunisia at the 2019 African Games held in Rabat, Morocco and he won the silver medal in the men's 56kg Snatch event. In 2020, he competed in the men's 61kg event at the Roma 2020 Weightlifting World Cup held in Rome, Italy. He won the bronze medals in the men's 61kg Snatch and Clean & Jerk events at the 2022 Mediterranean Games held in Oran, Algeria.

Achievements

References

External links 
 

Living people
1996 births
Place of birth missing (living people)
Tunisian male weightlifters
Islamic Solidarity Games competitors for Tunisia
African Weightlifting Championships medalists
African Games medalists in weightlifting
African Games gold medalists for Tunisia
Competitors at the 2015 African Games
Competitors at the 2019 African Games
Competitors at the 2022 Mediterranean Games
Mediterranean Games bronze medalists for Tunisia
Mediterranean Games medalists in weightlifting
21st-century Tunisian people